James Grehan may refer to:

 James Grehan (musician) (active from 2001), Australian singer-songwriter
 James Grehan (rugby league) (born 1987), Australian